Ganesh Mahabir (born 14 April 1958) is a Trinidadian cricketer who featured as a leg spinner. He played in 33 first-class matches for Trinidad and Tobago from 1975 to 1988. Mahabir also picked up 138 wickets at an average of 22.73 in his first class career.

See also
 List of Trinidadian representative cricketers

References

External links
 

1958 births
Living people
Trinidad and Tobago cricketers